The 2006–07 Tennessee Volunteers basketball team represented the University of Tennessee as a member of the Southeastern Conference during the 2006–07 NCAA Division I men's basketball season. Led by second-year head coach Bruce Pearl, the Volunteers played their home games at Thompson–Boling Arena in Knoxville, Tennessee. Tennessee finished third in the SEC East division standings, then were knocked out of the SEC Tournament in the quarterfinal round. After receiving an at-large bid to the NCAA tournament as the No. 5 seed in the Southeast region, Tennessee reached the Sweet Sixteen before losing to No. 1 seed and eventual National runner-up Ohio State by a single point in the regional semi-final. The team finished the season with a 24–11 record (10–6 SEC).

Roster

Schedule and results

|-
!colspan=9 style=| Non-conference regular season

|-
!colspan=9 style=| SEC regular season

|-
!colspan=9 style=| SEC tournament

|-
!colspan=9 style=| NCAA tournament

Rankings

References

Tennessee Volunteers basketball seasons
Tennessee
Tennessee
Volunteers
Volunteers